Yassine Alaoui Ismaili, known as Yoriyas, is a Moroccan street photographer and breakdancer based in Casablanca, Morocco.

Photography projects 
He started with photography in 2007, when his dance crew, Lhiba Kingzoo, was invited to perform in Salzburg, Austria. He bought a simple camera from a flea market to share photos of the trip with family.

From the Street to the Olympics chronicles breakdancing in Senegal, Morocco, Algeria, France, the Netherlands, and Germany.

Casablanca Not The Movie presents images of life in Casablanca, Morocco. These images counter Orientalist images of the city based on the 1942 American film Casablanca.

In 2020, Yoriyas organized Sourtna ( our image), the inaugural exhibition at the Moroccan National Photography Museum in Rabat.

References 

All stub articles

1984 births
Living people
Moroccan photographers